Sinopieris davidis is a species of butterfly in the genus Sinopieris, but also possibly in Pontia. It was described by Charles Oberthür in 1876 and is found in China.

Subspecies
 Sinopieris davidis davidis (Yunnan, Sichuan)
 Sinopieris davidis diluta (Verity, 1911) (Shaanxi)
 Sinopieris davidis thibetana (Verity 1907) (Tibet)

References

Pierini
Butterflies described in 1876
Taxa named by Charles Oberthür
Butterflies of Asia